Tulloch Limited was an Australian engineering and railway rolling stock manufacturer, located at Rhodes, New South Wales.

History
In 1885 Robert Tulloch founded Phoenix Iron Works in Pyrmont. In 1913 the business was incorporated as Tulloch's Phoenix Iron Works and relocated to Rhodes. It primarily built freight wagons for the New South Wales Government Railways but also built single deck electric carriages for the Sydney suburban network from 1926 until the 1957. During World War II a number of boats were built for the Royal Australian Navy including some 120ft Motor Lighters. In April 1948 the first of four seven-carriage HUB sets was delivered.

In the 1950s it commenced building locomotives with 27 Victorian Railways W class diesel hydraulic shunters and 13 Commonwealth Railways NT class diesel locomotives delivered.

In 1964 Tulloch delivered the first double-decker trailer cars for use in Sydney. After the success of the trailers, Tulloch built four experimental double-decker power cars in 1968, each with electrical equipment from four different manufacturers: English Electric, Toshiba, Hitachi and Mitsubishi, the latter being selected as the supplier for the S class double decker power cars. These four motor cars were each paired with modified matching trailers from the original fleet of 120, and ran as an 8-car set with the target plate S10, giving NSW the first fully double deck Electric Multiple Unit passenger train in the world.

In the 1970s it built 10 New South Wales 1200 class railcars and 2 Victorian Railways DRC class railcars. In October 1974 Tullochs ceased trading. The Rhodes Corporate Park has been built on the former site.

In 1988 Skitube Alpine Railway acquired a diesel mechanical locomotive built by Tulloch in 1958 for use as a depot shunter. This small locomotive was believed to have been the first to be built at the Tulloch plant at Rhodes.

Products
Vehicles manufactured by Tulloch Limited include:
203 Sydney single deck carriages
28 New South Wales HUB carriages
26 Victorian Railways W class (diesel-hydraulic) & 1 New South Wales 71 class locomotive
2-foot gauge diesel shunting locomotives
15 Western Australian Government Railways T class shunting locomotives
13 Commonwealth Railways NT class
120 Sydney double deck trailers
4 Sydney double deck power cars
10 New South Wales 1200 class railcars & 2 Victorian Railways DRC class railcars
3 South Maitland Railway railcars

Notes

Engineering companies of Australia
Defunct locomotive manufacturers of Australia
Defunct rolling stock manufacturers of Australia
Australian companies established in 1913
Australian companies disestablished in 1974
Manufacturing companies established in 1913
Manufacturing companies disestablished in 1974